Sant Sebastia de Montmajor is a small hamlet located 12 km north west of Caldes de Montbui, Catalonia, Spain. A notable a site is the Romanic Church from the 11th century.

References

 https://web.archive.org/web/20100621103925/http://www.caldesdemontbui.cat/plana.php?idplana=275&idp=193&nomitem=&ipare=93&ifill=&nomitem2=&planaaux=&directori=109
 http://www.romanicat.net/espanol/inventario_iglesias/ss_montmajor/ss_montmajor_esp.htm

Geography of Catalonia